Landsend Peak is a prominent wedge-shaped mountain located in the West Elk Mountains range northeast of Crawford, Colorado. Together with nearby Mount Lamborn to the northeast (the highest point in Delta County), it delineates the western edge of the West Elk Mountains (and West Elk Wilderness), and the two massifs top out about  higher than the adjacent North Fork Gunnison River. Both peaks lie within the Gunnison National Forest near the physiographic boundary of the Rocky Mountains and the Colorado Plateau provinces. Geologically, Landsend Peak and Mount Lamborn are exposed igneous intrusions that geologists call laccoliths.

References

External links
Topographical map

Mountains of Delta County, Colorado
West Elk Mountains
Gunnison National Forest
North American 3000 m summits